Wrexham Maelor was a local government district with borough status, being one of six districts in the county of Clwyd, north-east Wales, from 1974 to 1996.

History
The borough was created on 1 April 1974, under the Local Government Act 1972. It covered parts of four former districts which were all abolished at the same time:
Maelor Rural District
Marford and Hoseley parish from Hawarden Rural District
Wrexham Municipal Borough
Wrexham Rural District (except the parishes of Llangollen Rural and Llantysilio, which went to Glyndŵr)
The two Wrexham districts had been in the administrative county of Denbighshire prior to the reforms, whereas Maelor Rural District and the parish of Marford and Hoseley had both been exclaves of Flintshire, separated from the rest of the county by Denbighshire.

In 1996 the borough was abolished under the Local Government (Wales) Act 1994, which saw Clwyd County Council and its constituent districts abolished, being replaced by principal areas, whose councils perform the functions which had previously been divided between the county and district councils. The former Wrexham Maelor area all went to the new Wrexham County Borough, forming the bulk of the new borough.

Political control
The first election to the council was held in 1973, initially operating as a shadow authority alongside the outgoing authorities until it came into its powers on 1 April 1974. From 1974 until the council's abolition in 1996, political control was held by the following parties:

Premises
The council was based at the Guildhall in Wrexham, which had been built in 1961 as the headquarters for the former Wrexham Borough Council. After Wrexham Maelor's abolition in 1996 the building became the headquarters for the new Wrexham County Borough Council.

References

Former subdivisions of Wales
History of Denbighshire
History of Flintshire
Districts of Wales abolished in 1996
History of Wrexham County Borough
1974 establishments in Wales